Roy Gumbs (born 9 September 1954) is a Saint Kitts and Nevis/British professional middle/super middle/light heavy/cruiserweight boxer of the 1970s, '80s and '90s who won the British Boxing Board of Control (BBBofC) Southern (England) Area middleweight title, BBBofC British middleweight title, and Commonwealth middleweight title, and was a challenger for the International Boxing Federation (IBF) super middleweight title against Chong-Pal Park, his professional fighting weight varied from , i.e. middleweight to , i.e. cruiserweight.

References

External links

Image - Roy Gumbs

1954 births
Cruiserweight boxers
Light-heavyweight boxers
Living people
Middleweight boxers
Saint Kitts and Nevis male boxers
Super-middleweight boxers
British male boxers